The PHILIPS 1997 China FA Cup (Chinese: 1997飞利浦中国足球协会杯) was the third edition of Chinese FA Cup. The cup title sponsor was Philips.

Results

First round

First leg

Second leg

Second round

First leg

Second leg

Third round

First leg

Second leg

Semi-finals

First leg

Second leg

Final

References

1997
1997 in Chinese football
1997 domestic association football cups